Red Line Chemistry was an American hard rock band formed in 2004, hailing from Kansas City, Missouri. The band went on hiatus in 2014, but has since re-released their first album and performed at select shows.<ref name="KCS">{{cite web|url=http://www.kansascity.com/entertainment/ent-columns-blogs/back-to-rockville/article23598430.html|title=Tyson Leslie is throwing himself a farewell party - The Kansas City Star|quote=JUNE 11, 2015 ... The lineup comprises more than three dozen bands and performers, including Tyson Leslie & the Scarlet Letters, 90 Minutes, the Baloney Ponyz, the Zeros, Red Line Chemistry...}}</ref>

History

Originally named Penumbra, the band added vocalist Brett Ditgen and changed their name to Red Line Chemistry in 2004. With the help of local radio support in their home state of Missouri, the band was able to score a spot on stage at Kansas City Rock Fest 2007 and the Warped Tour. They have also performed 5 times between 2008 and 2011 at Pointfest,http://www.1057thepoint.com/Pointfest25/index.aspx a bi-annual rock festival held by rock station KPNT FM.

With the release of Tug of War on May 14, 2013, produced by Grammy-award-winning producer Nick Raskulinecz, the band spent much of the middle of the year touring alongside Nonpoint, Drowning Pool and Whitesnake.

Red Line Chemistry went on hiatus in 2014 after parting with Vertusent Music Group. In 2015, Pavement Entertainment contacted the band about recording a new album. Frontman Brett Ditgen told Pavement the band wasn't in the right place to do that, but they agreed that the band's earlier work should be remixed and re-released as Chemical High & a Hand Grenade (Special Edition). The band has only done occasional shows in the Kansas City area while on hiatus.

Members
Tom Brown – bass, vocals
Mike Mazzarese – percussion
Dave Fyten – guitar, vocals
Andrew Breit – guitar, keyboard, vocals
Brett Ditgen – lead vocals

Discography

Studio albums
 Chemical High & a Hand Grenade (2006)
 Dying for a Living (2010)
 Tug of War (2013)

Remix albums
 Chemical High & a Hand Grenade (Special Edition) (2015)

EPs
 Red Line Chemistry (2004)Red Line Chemistry by Red Line Chemistry (EP, Alternative Metal)
 Escape Plan (2008)
 Easy Does It'' (2011)

Singles

References 

Musical groups from Kansas City, Missouri
American post-grunge musical groups